Volleyball at the 1992 Summer Paralympics in Barcelona consisted of standing and sitting volleyball events for men.

Medal summary

Medal table

Men's standing volleyball team rosters 
Source: International Paralympic Committee

Men's sitting volleyball team rosters 
Source: International Paralympic Committee

References 

 

1992 Summer Paralympics events
1992
Paralympics